Biljana "Bilja" Krstić (Serbian Cyrillic: Биљана "Биља" Крстић, Serbo-Croatian pronunciation: [bǐʎana bǐːʎa kř̩ːstitɕ]; born 9 November 1955) is a Serbian singer. She was born in 1955 in Niš and brought up on the folk traditions of central Serbia. Biljana first studied music in Niš and continued her education in Belgrade to study music at the Belgrade University of Arts. Upon graduating in Belgrade she set out on an extremely successful career in music. To date she has released seven albums and has written scores for such films as Savior, Zona Zamfirova and The Man Who Defended Gavrilo Princip. She lives with her two daughters in Belgrade.

Biography

Bilja has been on the Yugoslav pop scene for a long time. Her stage experience started at a very young age in Chorus of Youth; later, in the 1970s, she was a member of the cult bands Suncokret and Rani Mraz, led by Bora Đorđević and  Đorđe Balašević respectively. After the break-up of Rani Mraz, she went solo. Her first album was released in 1983. She has released three pop-oriented records, and did music for many theatre shows at Belgrade's National Theatre. In the meantime, she graduated from University of Musical Arts, and started to work as a Music Editor on Radio Belgrade.

After a successful career in pop music, Bilja Krstić has decided to record material close to her heart ever since her childhood. For more than five years, she patiently collected obscure folk songs from the territories of Kosovo, Serbia, Macedonia, Romania, Hungary, Bulgaria, Bosnia and Herzegovina, Montenegro and Greece. The results were the albums Bistrik (2001) and Zapisi (2003). Bistrik was re-released by V2-Greece record label, in May 2002.

Her third folk Album, Tarpoš, was released across Europe in early 2007, under the licence of German record label Intuition/Schott Music, and gained great success amongst World Music critics and audiences (Magazine Songlines, London – Top of the world, and TRADMagazine, France - “Bravos”). Her fourth, the very interesting a capella album The Wellspring, was released in 2013 (PGP-RTS) and the fifth, Svod, under the licence of England record label ARC Music (2016). 

The music performed by Bilja Krstić is a fusion: a blend of traditional ethno music, a cappella songs and ethno grooves with elements of improvisation and modern music approach. Their aim is to translate folklore into contemporary art, and for performances to awaken the heart and give rebirth and energy to forgotten emotions. Her sincere stage presence and beautiful voice received great acclaim at more than 600 concerts across the world and in her home country; it was best acknowledged when she was invited as the only female vocal performer from Mediterranean at festival "Mostra Sesc de Artes" in São Paulo in 2005. At the time, she was a member of "Mediterraneo Orchestra", formed from about 25 top musicians from all over the world.

Discography
With Suncokret:

Singles:

 "Gde ćeš biti, lepa Kejo" / "Pusto more, pusti vali" (1976)
 "Rock 'n' Roll duku duku" / "Gili gili blues" (1976)
 "Oj, nevene" / "Tekla voda" (ZKP RTLJ 1976)
 "Imam pesmu za sve ljude" / "Čovek koga znam" (1978)

Albums:

 Moje bube (1977) 

With Rani Mraz:

Singles:

 "Računajte na nas" / "Strašan žulj" (1978)
 "Oprosti mi Katrin" / "Život je more" (1978)
 "Panonski mornar" / "Moja draga sad je u Japanu" (1979)
 "Lagana stvar" / "Prvi januar (popodne)" (1979)

Albums:

 Mojoj mami umesto maturske slike u izlogu (1979)
 Odlazi cirkus (1980)

Solo albums:
 Prevari večeras svoje društvo sa mnom (1983)
 Iz unutrasnjeg džepa (1985)
 Loptom do zvezda (1990)
 Bilja (1994)

With Bistrik Orchestra:
 Bistrik (2001)
 Zapisi (2003)
 Tarpoš (2007)
 Izvorištе (2013)
Svod (2017)

Collaborations
She worked with Tenores di Bitti "Mialinu Pira", David D`Or, Marta Sebestyen, Yanka Rupkina, Amira Medunjanin, Tamara Obrovac, Bojan Zulfikarpašić, Vlatko Stefanovski, Nenad Vasilić, Magda Dourado Pucci, Grupa "Synthesis", Vasko Atanasovski, Vlado Kreslin, Bora Dugić, Boban Marković and Marko Marković and others.

External links
Bilja Krstic's official website

1955 births
Living people
Women rock singers
Musicians from Niš
21st-century Serbian women singers
Serbian rock singers
Yugoslav rock singers
Serbian pop singers
University of Arts in Belgrade alumni
Yugoslav women singers
20th-century Serbian women singers